The Kungarakany people, also spelt Koongurrukuñ, Kungarrakany, Kungarakan and other variants, are an Aboriginal Australian people of the Northern Territory. They were called the "Paperbark People" by European settlers.

Country
They included the inland area north-east of Mount Litchfield, around the mid-waters of the Reynolds River and the headwaters of the Adelaide River. Their north-eastern limits were close to Rum Jungle and Batchelor. Kungarakan traditional land encompasses Adelaide River, Batchelor, Rum Jungle, Finniss River, Litchfield Park, and Berry Springs, including the Territory Wildlife Park.

Language

Alternative names
They were known to European settlers as the "Paperbark People".
Alternative names and spellings include:
 Gunerakan
 Kangarraga
 Kangarranga
 Warnunger
 Ungnakan

Notable people
 Kathy Mills, first woman on the Northern Land Council
 Marlon Motlop, footballer and musician (on his mother's side)
 Tom Calma, Chancellor of the University of Canberra

Notes

Citations

Sources

Aboriginal peoples of the Northern Territory